Rhys Davies is a British slalom canoeist who competed at the international level from 2008 to 2015 in the C2 class with Matthew Lister.

He won two bronze medals in the C2 team event at the ICF Canoe Slalom World Championships, earning them in 2011 and 2013.

References

British male canoeists
Living people
Year of birth missing (living people)
Medalists at the ICF Canoe Slalom World Championships